Nemophora associatella is a moth of the Adelidae family. It is found from Germany and Poland to the Pyrenees, Italy and the Balkan Peninsula. It is also present in Russia.

The wingspan is about 19 mm.

The larvae feed on Abies alba. They mine the leaves of their host plant. The larva mines a single leaf and drops to the ground with this leaf. It then cuts it and uses it as a case to feed on detritus. Mining larvae can be found in June. The larvae are whitish with a brown head.

Taxonomy
This species was erroneously placed into the genus Adela by several authors.

References

External links
lepiforum.de

Moths described in 1839
Adelidae
Moths of Europe